Birri (Bviri) is a nearly extinct, possibly Central Sudanic language of CAR and South Sudan.  According to Boyeldieu (2010), its classification as Central Sudanic has yet to be demonstrated, but Starostin (2016) finds its closest relative to be Kresh.

There are two main varieties of Birri, Mboto and Munga. In 1911, a few thousand people were reported in Rafaï, Central African Republic, with a marginal population further to the east in Obo. Stefano Santandrea (1966) wrote a lexicon and grammatical sketch of the Mboto dialect in Deim Zubeir, South Sudan.

See also
Birri word list (Wiktionary)

References

Roger Blench (2012) Nilo-Saharan language listing

Bongo–Bagirmi languages